Tyberton or Tiberton is a village and civil parish  west of Hereford, in the county of Herefordshire, England. In 2011 the parish had a population of 178. The parish touches Blakemere, Madley, Peterchurch, Preston on Wye and Vowchurch. Tyberton shares a parish council with Blakemere, Bredwardine, Moccas and Preston-on-Wye called "Wyeside Group Parish Council".

Landmarks 
There are 9 listed buildings in Tyberton. Tyberton has a church called St Mary.

History 
The name "Tyberton" means 'Tidbeorht's farm/settlement'. Tyberton was recorded in the Domesday Book as Tibrintintune.

References

External links 

 

Villages in Herefordshire
Civil parishes in Herefordshire